, pseudonym of Tokohiro Iwaki, was a noted Japanese author in the I Novel genre.

Kambayashi was born in a village now part of Kuroshio in Kōchi Prefecture. In 1927 he received a graduate degree in English literate from the University of Tokyo and took a job with the Kaizo publishing company. That same year he began to write and continued until 1973, despite two debilitating strokes.

All told, Kambayashi published more than two hundred stories, most of which are based on personal experiences. According to Donald Keene, these stories fall into three broad clusters: those set in the village of Shikoku where he grew up; those relating to the illness and madness of his wife; and those describing his younger sister. Perhaps the best known is Sei Yohane byōin nite (In the Hospital of St. John, 1946), in which describes the slow death of his wife in the middle of a war-torn country.

Kambayashi received the 1964 Yomiuri Prize for Shiroi yakatabune, and in 1969 became a member of the Japan Art Academy.

References 
 Donald Keene, Dawn to the West: Japanese literature of the modern era, fiction, Volume 1, Columbia University Press, 2nd edition, 1998, pages 541–555. .
 Shunkin.net: Literature Japonais 

1902 births
1980 deaths
20th-century Japanese writers
Yomiuri Prize winners
People from Kōchi Prefecture
Writers from Kōchi Prefecture
20th-century pseudonymous writers